Dobler may refer to:

Dobler (surname)
USS Dobler (DE-48) American naval ship

See also